Tiago Maria Menezes Vilhena Girão (born 30 November 1984 in Lisbon) is a Portuguese rugby union footballer. He plays as a flanker.
 
He played for CDUL in Portugal, moving to CRC Madrid Noroeste, in Spain, for the season of 2007/08. He returned to CDUL at 2008/09.

He holds 42 caps for Portugal, since his first match, in 2006, with 2 tries, 3 conversions, and 1 penalty scored, 19 points in aggregate. Girão played three times at the 2007 Rugby World Cup finals, in the matches with New Zealand, Italy and Romania, without scoring.

He also played at the 2009 Sevens World Cup in Dubai.

References

External links

1984 births
Living people
Portuguese rugby union players
Portugal international rugby union players
Rugby union flankers
Rugby union players from Lisbon